Paralia Platanou (English "Platanos Beach", Greek "Παραλία Πλατάνου"), is a village situated on the seashore below Platanos village. It has to a degree assumed the name Platanos, though that term actually refers to the larger town above the shore (which is referred to as Pano or Ano (Upper) Platanos. The entrance to the village is found a short distance beyond Kryoneri Bay, on the 155th km (97th mile) of the Old National Corinth-Patras Road at a designated exit.

Paralia Platanou is three times the size and twice the population of its mother village, owing its development to its proximity to the seashore and hence to the large number of people who visit it on a regular basis in the summer as well as at Easter and Christmas. Noted beaches are Avgolemono (153rd km/98th mile), Liontari (160th km/100th mile), and the neighbouring Punta Beach, below Trapeza village.

Platanos is famous for its natural Artesian spring water, and for Λιοντάρι (Liontari, i.e. a natural, house-sized rocky formation in the shape of a lion at the western end of the village on the edge of a mountain slope.

Beaches of Greece
Populated places in Achaea